Cheshmeh or Chashmeh may refer to:
 Cheshmeh, Bushehr
 Cheshmeh, Isfahan
 Chashmeh, Markazi
 Cheshmeh, Markazi
 Cheshmeh, North Khorasan
 Cheshmeh, South Khorasan
 Cheshmeh, Razavi Khorasan
 Cheshmeh, Bardaskan, Razavi Khorasan Province
 Cheshmeh, Mehrestan, Sistan and Baluchestan Province
 Cheshmeh, West Azerbaijan

See also
 Cheshmeh and Chashmeh are common elements in Iranian place names; see  and 
 Chesma (disambiguation)
 Cheshma (disambiguation)
 Chashma (disambiguation)